Pippo Santonastaso (born 25 May 1936) is an Italian actor and comedian.

Life and career 
Born in Castel San Giovanni, Piacenza, Santonastaso created an original comic duo with his younger brother Mario (1937 – 8 January 2021), performing successfully in their region and soon also on television, in several RAI variety shows. Following his television success, in the second half of the 1970s he started a parallel career of character actor in numerous comedy films, several of them as sidekick of Adriano Celentano. He was main actor just once, in the commedia sexy all'italiana Geometra Prinetti selvaggiamente Osvaldo.

References

External links 

1936 births
People from the Province of Piacenza
Italian male stage actors
Italian male film actors
Italian male television actors
Living people